Van-a-1, Van-a-2 was a Belgian children's television programme. The programme premiered on Monday, 5 September 1994, the day where TV2 received a major revamp in its programme line-up and so as their idents. It was shown every Wednesday at 4:00pm (Belgian time). The children's programme was shown the last time on Wednesday, 26 November 1997.  The children's programme was discontinued due to the separation of BRTN TV2 into 2 channels on Monday, 1 December 1997 at 7:00 am (Belgian time). The CD was also released in 1994. The series later repeated on its successor, Ketnet.

Belgian children's television shows
1994 Belgian television series debuts
1997 Belgian television series endings